The Malaysian Maritime Enforcement Agency Act 2004 is an act to establish the Malaysian Maritime Enforcement Agency to perform enforcement functions for ensuring the safety and security of the Malaysia Maritime Zone with a view to the protection of maritime and other national interests in that zone.  It came into force on 15 February 2005.

Structure
The Malaysian Maritime Enforcement Agency Act 2004, in its current form (1 January 2006), consists of 4 Parts containing 19 sections and no schedule (including no amendment).
 Part I: Preliminary
 Part II: Establishment of Agency and Appointments
 Part III: Functions and Powers of the Agency
 Part IV: General

External links

 Malaysian Maritime Enforcement Agency Act 2004 

2004 in Malaysian law
Malaysian federal legislation